Ridertown is an unincorporated community in Knox Township, Jay County, Indiana.

History
A post office was established at Ridertown in 1891, and remained in operation until it was discontinued in 1904. The name of the community honors the Rider family.

Geography

References

Unincorporated communities in Jay County, Indiana
Unincorporated communities in Indiana